Fernanda Brum Costa da Cruz Pinheiro (born 19 December 1976) is a Brazilian Christian singer, songwriter, worship pastor and writer.

Biography 
Born in Rio de Janeiro, she grew up in Irajá, a middle-class neighborhood in the north. Fernanda has three siblings, namely: Marcia Brum, Bruno Costa and Louise Costa; Her parents are Nelio Brum (Policial officer) Costa and Maria Fernandes Costa. Since she was a little girl, Fernanda always had contact with the musical world, and as a child Fernanda won a TV contest singing to represent the school in which she studied. Fernanda has done theater course, sang jingles among other things. On 18 May 1996, Fernanda Brum married the singer and pastor Emerson Pinheiro music producer, 26 both pastors of Central Baptist Church in Barra da Tijuca. She participated in the group "Voices" for several years.

She participated in 2011 Festival Promessas, alongside Ana Paula Valadão, the band leader Diante do Trono, Ludmila Ferber and Damares.

In 2015, she was nominated for the 16th Latin Grammy Awards in the Best Christian Album (Portuguese Language) category. She was nominated again for the same award in 2017 with her album Ao Vivo em Israel.

Discography 

Solo career

Studio albums

Live albums

International

Collected

Live albums

Amigas Project

with Voices
Colores del Amor (1997)
Corações Gratos (1999)
Por Toda Vida (2009)
Coração de Criança (2001)
Aliança (2002)
Acústico (2005)
Sobreviverei (2007)
Natal (2008)
Para Sempre (2012)

Bibliography 
E Foi Assim... (2013)

References

External links

1976 births
Living people
Brazilian Christian religious leaders
Christian music songwriters
Brazilian gospel singers
Brazilian singer-songwriters
Brazilian evangelicals
Latin Grammy Award winners
Musicians from Rio de Janeiro (city)
Performers of contemporary worship music
21st-century Brazilian singers
21st-century Brazilian women singers
Brazilian women singer-songwriters
Women in Latin music